Liuying may refer to the following places:

 Liouying District (alternately Liuying), a district in Tainan, Taiwan
 Liuying railway station, a railway station in Liouying (Liuying), Tainan, Taiwan
 Liuying Subdistrict, a subdistrict of Qiaoxi, Hebei Province, China

See also
Liu Ying (disambiguation)